Los Locos del cuarto piso is a black and white 1937 Argentine comedy film directed by Lisandro de la Tea and written by Manuel Collazo, based on the play by Francisco E. Collazo.   The film premiered on November 10, 1937 in Buenos Aires.

Cast
Anselmo Aieta
Óscar Alonso
Francisco Álvarez
Enrique Arellano
Héctor Coire
María Esther Gamas
Pedro Laxalt
Lopecito
Perla Mary
José Mazilli
Félix Mutarelli
Ilde Pirovano
Benita Puértolas
Juan Sarcione
Oscar Villa

References

External links

1937 films
1930s Spanish-language films
Argentine black-and-white films
1937 comedy films
Argentine comedy films
1930s Argentine films